Faculty of Materials Science, Technology and Designe of Kazimierz Pułaski University of Technology and Humanities in Radom is one of the eight divisions of the Kazimierz Pułaski University of Technology and Humanities in Radom, Poland.

History

In 1951, by the initiative of the Central Union of the Tanning Industry, the Faculty of Chemistry and Tanning was established as a division of Extramural School of Engineering in Radom (what is now Kazimierz Pułaski University of Technology and Humanities in Radom).  The first dean of the Faculty was docent Mieczysław Pietrzykowski.  In 1951 the Faculty's branch in Pionki was established.  It was functioning until 1957, when the Faculty was disbanded.  The Faculty was reactivated in 1963 as the Faculty of Tanning (the only this type faculty in the country). Following the transformation of the Extramural School of Engineering in Radom into the Kielce-Radom Extramural School of Engineering in Kielce, the Faculty of Tanning became one of its divisions. After the next change of school's name in 1967 (Kielce-Radom Higher School of Engineering in Kielce) the Faculty's name was also change to Faculty of Shoe Technology and Tanning. Following the transformation of the Kielce-Radom Higher School of Engineering in Kielce into Świętokrzyskie Polytechnic (Kielce University of Technology) the Faculty was disbanded and in its place the Institute of Plastic and Leather was established. After the separation from the Kielce University of Technology the independent Higher School of Engineering in Radom, the Institute of Plastic and Leather was transformed into the Faculty of Material Science and Shoe Technology. In 1999 the new wing was completed, where the laboratories are based. Following the widening scientific and didactic activities, the Faculty's name was changed again. Since 2008 it is known as the Faculty of Material Science, Technology and Design (Polish: Wydział Materiałoznawstwa, Technologii i Wzornictwa). On June 18, 2008, the Faculty's Council has made a decision to establish the Nonresident Educational Center in Puławy, however it has never been functioning. The Faculty's authorities are undertaking intensive efforts to acquire the right to award doctor's academic degree in the field of chemical technology.

Faculty's names in chronological order
 Faculty of Chemistry and Tanning (1951–1957)
 Faculty of Tanning (1963–1967)
 Faculty of Shoe Technology and Tanning (1967–1974)
 Institute of Plastic and Leather (1974–1978)
 Faculty of Material Science and Shoe Technology (1978–2008)
 Faculty of Material Science, Technology and Designe (since 2008)

Deans
 Docent Mieczysław Pietrzykowski, M.S. (1951–1955)
 Kazimierz Wańkowicz, M.S. (1955–1957)
 Jan Ciach, M.S. (1963–1968)
 Stanisław Kądzielawa, M.S. (1968–1971)
 Docent Olgierd Rodziewicz, Ph.D. (1971–1981)
 Docent Wiktor Lasek, Ph.D., D.S. (1981–1984)
 Prof. Tomasz Prot, Ph.D., D.S. (1984–1986)
 Prof. Lech Stolarczyk, Ph.D., D.S. (1986–1989)
 Prof. Jerzy Urbański, Ph.D., D.S. (1990–1992)
 Dr. Stanisław Banaszkiewicz, Ph.D. (1992–1996)
 Prof. Marian Włodzimierz Sułek, Ph.D., D.S. (1996–2002)
 Prof. Krzysztof Śmiechowski, Ph.D., D.S. (2002–2008)
 Prof. Andrzej Marek Firkowski, Ph.D., D.S. (2008–2010)
 Prof. Maria Pawłowa, Ph.D., D.S. (2010-2012)
 Prof. Marian Włodzimierz Sułek, Ph.D., D.S. (2012-2013)
 Prof. Krzysztof Śmiechowski, Ph.D., D.S. (since 2013)

Programs

 Chemical technology, first cycle (bachelor - inżynier) and second cycle (master - magister) studies, specializations:
 polymers chemistry and technology
 environment engendering and protection
 material science of petroleum products
 cosmetics and household chemicals biotechnology and technology
 leather technology
 drugs technology (only second cycle)
 cosmetics and pharmaceutical products (only second cycle)
 forensics (only second cycle)
 Industrial Design, first cycle (bachelor - licencjat) and second cycle (master - magister) studies, specializations:
 footwear design (only first cycle)
 fashion design (only first cycle)
 Cosmetology, first cycle (bachelor - licencjat) studies, specializations:
 natural cosmetics
 innovative multifunctional cosmetics
 Occupational safety and health, first cycle (bachelor - inżynier) studies
 Environmental technology, first cycle (bachelor - inżynier) studies

Administration

 Dean - Prof. Marian Sułek, Ph.D., D.S.
 Vice Dean for Didactics and Students - Dr. Jerzy Borycki, Ph.D.
 Vice Dean for Research - Dr. Tomasz Wasilewski, Ph.D.

Organization

 Chair of Chemistry
 Department of Physical and Inorganic Chemistry
 Laboratory of Cosmetics and Household Products Commodity Science
 Department of Organic Chemistry
 Chair of Design, Footwear and Clothing Technology
 Department of Design
 Footwear Design Studio
 Clothing Design Studio
 Department of Material Science, Footwear and Clothing Technology
 Laboratory of Footwear and Clothing Material Science
 Laboratory of Footwear Technology
 Laboratory of Clothing Technology
 Department of Production Management and Engineering
 Chair of Organic Materials Technology
 Department of Polymers Chemistry and Technology
 Department of Petroleum Products
 Laboratory of Computer Aided Chemistry
 Laboratory of Chemical Technology
 Chair of Environmental Protection
 Department of Analytical Chemistry
 Department of Process and Environmental Engineering
 Department of Tanning and Furriery

Other units (non-degree postgraduate courses) 

 School of Footwear Production Technology and Organization
 School of Operating Fluids Material Science

References

External links 
 

Kazimierz Pułaski University of Technology and Humanities in Radom
Engineering universities and colleges in Poland